"Scream Like a Baby" is a song written by David Bowie. It appears on the 1980 album Scary Monsters (And Super Creeps).

Music and lyrics
The song focuses on a protagonist called Sam who is evidently being held, along with the track's narrator, in a political prison. Though set in the future, the story is related in the past tense, in a fashion Bowie has described as "future nostalgia... A past look at something that hasn't happened yet". Musically the song is noted for its "ultra-modern new wave guitar/synth sound", as well as for Bowie's use of varispeed vocals to illustrate Sam's downward spiral in the prison hospital – according to NME critics Roy Carr and Charles Shaar Murray, the effect is "as if the narrator of 'All the Madmen' inhabited the world of '1984'".

"Scream Like a Baby" was one of several tracks on Scary Monsters that evolved from pieces Bowie had written years before. It was originally composed in 1973, with different lyrics, as "I Am a Laser" for The Astronettes (Ava Cherry, Geoffrey MacCormack and Jason Guess). Bowie worked on an album for the group but it was eventually dropped, finally surfacing in 1995 as the Ava Cherry album People from Bad Homes; "I Am a Laser" was one of the tracks.

Bowie intended to play the song during his 1987 Glass Spider Tour, but dropped the song from the set list before the tour started.

Other releases
 It was released as the B-side of the single "Fashion" in October 1980.

Personnel
According to Chris O'Leary:
David Bowie – lead and backing vocals
Carlos Alomar – guitar
Andy Clark – synthesizer
George Murray – bass
Dennis Davis – drums

Production
David Bowie – producer
Tony Visconti – producer

Notes

David Bowie songs
1980 songs
Songs written by David Bowie
Song recordings produced by Tony Visconti
Song recordings produced by David Bowie